DeAndre Rashard Presley (born January 10, 1990) is a former American football wide receiver. He played college football at Appalachian State.

College career
In 2010, he replaced Armanti Edwards at quarterback for the Mountaineers and led the team to a 10–3 record before losing to the Villanova Wildcats in the quarterfinals of the 2010 FCS playoffs. On December 1, he was named as one of three finalists for the 2010 Walter Payton Award.

In the first game of the 2011 season, Appalachian State squared up against the Virginia Tech Hokies and were blown out 66–13. Afterwards, Presley told USA Today, "Not taking anything away from them, but I wouldn't classify them as an elite team." Presley threw 7 for 18 (a 39% completion rate) for 89 yards with two interceptions and one fumble in the game.

Professional career

San Diego Chargers
On April 29, 2012, he was signed as a cornerback by the San Diego Chargers as an undrafted free agent.

Miami Dolphins
He was promoted from the practice squad to the active roster.

Carolina Panthers
On September 18, 2013, he was signed to the Panthers' practice squad. After the Panthers released Jason Avant on November 18, 2014, Presley was promoted to the active roster. Presley was released on September 1, 2015.

Legal Troubles 
On January 31, 2018, an arrest warrant was issued for Presley, subsequently he turned himself in. He is accused of having sex (sexual battery) with a student 16 or 17 years of age according to the Spartanburg County Sheriff’s Office. He has since resigned from his position with the school.

References

External links
 DeAndre Presley GoASU.com
  usatoday.com
 San Diego Chargers bio
 Miami Dolphins bio

1990 births
Living people
Players of American football from Tampa, Florida
American football quarterbacks
American football cornerbacks
Appalachian State Mountaineers football players
San Diego Chargers players
Miami Dolphins players
Carolina Panthers players